Bang! is a Spaghetti Western-themed social deduction card game designed by Emiliano Sciarra and released by Italian publisher DV Giochi in 2002. In 2004, Bang! won the Origins Award for Best Traditional Card Game of 2003 and Best Graphic Design of a Card Game or Expansion.

The game is known worldwide as Bang!, except in France, where it was known as Wanted! until September 2009.

Overview
The game is played by four to seven players (four to eight players with variants and expansions). Each player takes one of the following roles:

 Sheriff (always 1)
 Deputy (min. 0, max. 2)
 Outlaw (min. 2, max. 3)
 Renegade (min. 1, max. 2 with expansions)

Each player also receives a unique character card with special abilities and a certain number of 'bullets' (i.e. life-points).

The objective of the game is different for every role:
 The Outlaws must kill the Sheriff;
 The Sheriff and his Deputies must kill the Outlaws and the Renegade(s);
 Each Renegade's objective is to be the last player in play. The Renegade(s) must kill all the players with the sheriff being the last one dead.

Game

Setup
Each player is randomly dealt a Character card and a Role card: there is always a Sheriff, two Outlaws and a Renegade. Roles depend on the number of players (for example, with 7 players there will be 1 Sheriff, 2 Deputies, 3 Outlaws and 1 Renegade). The Role cards are given face down to each player. The Sheriff shows his card. With the expansion, it is possible to play with only three players using a Deputy, an Outlaw and a Renegade.

Gameplay
The game is played in turns, in clockwise order, with the Sheriff beginning. Each player's turn is divided into three phases:

Draw
The active player draws the top two cards from the draw pile. Each player is required to do this at the beginning of his turn. If the draw pile runs out of card, shuffle the discard pile to create a new draw pile. Some characters have abilities that vary the number of cards drawn per turn.

Play
The player may choose to heal or buff himself, attack other players in an attempt to eliminate them, or choose to play no cards at all. Any number of cards may be played in a player's turn, but there are two limitations on which card can be played:
 Only one Bang! card may be played per turn (unless there is an effect that allows the player to play more than one).
 The player cannot play a card with the same name as the card previously played.
Each player can only have one weapon at a time. If a player wishes to play a new weapon card when he already has one, the old weapon must be discarded first.
Cards can be played only during a player's turn (with the exception of "Beer", "Bang!" and "Missed!").
Normally, a card has an effect which is immediately resolved, and then the card is discarded. However, blue-bordered cards, like weapons and horses, have long-lasting effects, and are kept on the table face up in front of the player. In the Dodge City expansion, green-bordered cards are played face up and cannot be used until the player's next turn, then are discarded.
The effects of these cards (in play) last until they are discarded or removed somehow (e.g. "Cat Balou" or "Panic") or a special event occurs (e.g. in the case of "Jail" or "Dynamite".)

Discard
Once the second phase is over, the player must discard from any cards exceeding the hand size limit. The hand size limit of a player (at the end of a turn) is equal to the number of bullets shown on the player's character card. Then it is the next player's turn, in clockwise order.

Game concepts
Generally speaking (as there are exceptions):

 Distance: Distance is defined as the smallest number of characters from one player to another. For example, at a table of four, the players to the left and right of the player are at a distance of 1, and the player across the table is at a distance of 2.
 Dealing damage: Cards bearing a "Bang!" icon are used to deal damage to other players.
 "Bang!" cards: Cards explicitly labeled "Bang!" can only be used in accordance with a player's range. By default, a player has a range of 1. If he has a weapon that can fire to a distance of 3, he can target any player at a distance of 3 or less. A player may play only one "Bang!" card during his turn. Other cards can be played without restriction during the turn.
 Avoiding damage: If a player is targeted by a "Bang!", he can play a "Missed" card to avoid getting shot; otherwise, he loses a bullet.
 Bullets: A player's life points are represented by bullets. When a player loses his last bullet, he is dead and removed from the game.
 Restoring bullets: Cards bearing beer icons are used to restore bullets up to the character's maximum. "Beer" cards can be used out-of-turn to prevent death and remain at 1 bullet.
 "Draw!": To "Draw!" means to reveal the first card of the deck and check the card's suit and value. Some cards will trigger only when Hearts or Spades are revealed.

Penalties and rewards
 If the Sheriff eliminates a Deputy, he must discard all the cards he has in hand and in play.
 Any player who eliminates an Outlaw (even if the eliminating player is himself an Outlaw) must draw a reward of 3 cards from the deck.

End of game and winner(s)
The game ends as soon as the Sheriff is dead, then the remaining players determine the winner(s). If there are at least two players still alive or the only player left is an Outlaw, all the Outlaws win, dead or alive. If the only player left is a Renegade, the Renegade wins.

The game also ends once all Outlaws and Renegades are dead, provided that the Sheriff is still alive. In this case, the Sheriff and all the Deputies win, dead or alive.

Strategy

As only the Sheriff is known, it is hard to know who has what role. Generally, a player's role is implied if he tries to shoot, or otherwise harm, the Sheriff. Others' roles can be implied if they try to harm those who harmed the Sheriff. The advantage of keeping one's role hidden from enemies must be weighed against the need to accomplish one's goal.

Since the Renegade loses if the Sheriff dies when there are still others in the game, he must defend the Sheriff to some extent. On the other hand, his ultimate goal is killing the Sheriff. This leads to a "two faced" nature of the Renegade, trying to weaken each side (Outlaws and Deputies) while keeping the Sheriff alive until the end. This also makes it harder to ascertain who is an Outlaw, who is a Deputy, and who is a Renegade, as their actions may be similar.

Characters
There are 16 different characters in the base set, each with a different ability:

 Bart Cassidy = Butch Cassidy – Each time he loses a life point, he immediately draws a card from the deck. (4 life points)
 Black Jack = Tom Ketchum (known as Black Jack) – During phase 1 of his turn, he must show the second card he draws; on Hearts or Diamonds, he draws one additional card that turn (without revealing it). (4 life points)
 Calamity Janet = Calamity Jane – She can use "Bang!" cards as "Missed!" cards and vice versa. She is still subject to the "Bang!" limitation: If she plays a "Missed!" card as a "Bang!", she cannot play another "Bang!" card that turn (unless she has a Volcanic in play). (4 life points)
 El Gringo = gringo (slang Spanish word) – Each time he loses a life point due to a card played by another player, Gringo draws a random card from the hand of that player (one card for each life; up to the number of cards in hand). (3 life points)
 Jesse Jones = Jesse James – During phase 1 of his turn, he may choose to draw the first card from the deck, or randomly from the hand of any other player. Then he draws the second card from the deck. (4 life points)
 Jourdonnais = "Frenchy" Jourdonnais, the riverboat captain in The Big Sky novel and movie (Fictional person) – He is considered to have a "Barrel" in play at all times; he can "Draw!" when he is the target of a "Bang!", and on Hearts, he is missed. If he has an actual "Barrel" card in play, he can count both of them, giving him two chances to cancel the "Bang!" before playing a "Missed!" (4 life points)
 Kit Carlson = Kit Carson – During the phase 1 of his turn, he looks at the top three cards of the deck, then chooses two to draw and puts the other one back on the top of the deck, face down. (4 life points)
 Lucky Duke = Lucky Luke (Fictional person) – Each time he is required to "Draw!", he flips the top two cards from the deck and chooses the result he prefers. Both cards are discarded afterwards. (4 life points)
 Paul Regret = Paul Regret – The Comancheros (Fictional person) – He is considered to have a "Mustang" in play at all times; all other players must add 1 to the distance to him. If he has an actual "Mustang" card in play, he can count both of them, increasing all distance to him by a total of 2. (3 life points)
 Pedro Ramirez = Tuco Ramirez – The Ugly in the film The Good, the Bad and the Ugly (Fictional person) – During phase 1 of his turn, he may choose to draw the first card from the top of the discard pile or from the deck. Then he draws the second card from the deck. (4 life points)
 Rose Doolan = She is considered to have a "Scope" ("Appaloosa" in older versions) in play at all times; she sees all other players at a distance decreased by 1 (to the minimum of 1). If she has an actual "Scope" card in play, she can count both of them, reducing her distance to all other players by a total of 2. (4 life points)
 Sid Ketchum = Tom Ketchum – At any time, he may discard two cards from his hand to regain one life point. If he is willing and able to, he can use this ability more than once at a time. (4 life points)
 Slab the Killer = Angel Eyes, the Bad in the film The Good, the Bad and the Ugly (Fictional person) – Players trying to cancel his "Bang!" cards need to play two "Missed!". The "Barrel" effect, if successfully used, only counts as one "Missed!" (4 life points)
 Suzy Lafayette = Each time she has no cards in her hand, she instantly draws a card from the draw pile. Her ability cannot be used, when she is under effect Duel. When the duel ends and she has no cards in her hands, she may take one card again. (4 life points)
 Vulture Sam = Each time another player is eliminated, Sam takes all the cards that player had in his hand and in play, then adds them to his hand. (4 life points)
 Willy the Kid = Billy the Kid – During his turn, he can play any number of "Bang!" cards. (4 life points)

Expansions

Many expansions have been introduced since the release of Bang!:

High Noon (2003)
High Noon contains a set of thirteen scenario cards that are given to the Sheriff, and revealed at the start of each of his turns – the card's scenario is effective until the next scenario card has been revealed. The name is inspired by the Western High Noon.

The cards include:
 Blessing: All cards are considered Hearts.
 Curse: All cards are considered Spades.
 Daltons: When this card enters play, all players with a blue card in play discard one of them.
 Doctor: When this card enters play, the player(s) with the lowest life points gain 1 life point.
 Ghost Town: Dead players enter play with 0 life points and 3 cards on their turn, and die when their turn ends.
 Gold Rush: Turn order direction is reversed, i.e. counter-clockwise.
 Hangover: Players lose their character ability.
 Reverend: Players cannot play "Beer" on their turns.
 Sermon: Players cannot play "Bang!" on their turns.
 Shootout: Players can play one extra "Bang!" on their turns.
 Thirst: Players draw 1 card less at the start of their turn.
 Train Arrival: Players draw 1 extra card at the start of their turn.
 High Noon: At the beginning of each player's turn, he loses 1 life point. This must be always the last card, and stays in play until the game ends.

Dodge City (2004)
Dodge City has a set of fifteen new characters and 40 new play cards. There is also a set of 8 "role" cards (7 duplicates) allowing up to 8 people to play. It features also a new symbol, meaning "discard another card from your hand in order to play this card", and a new card type, the green-bordered cards: they are played like blue cards, but cannot be used until the next opponent's turn (in case of a Missed! effect) or the owner's next turn (in all other cases) and are discarded immediately after they are used. The name is inspired by the Western, Dodge City.

The box contains:
 15 new characters
 Apache Kid: Diamonds cards played by other players do not affect him. (3 life points)
 Belle Star: During her turn, cards in play in front of other players have no effect. (4 life points)
 Bill Noface: During phase 1 of his turn, he draws 1 card, plus 1 card for each wound he has. (4 life points)
 Chuck Wengam: During his turn, he may choose to lose 1 life point to draw 2 cards. (4 life points)
 Doc Holyday: During his turn, he may discard 2 cards from his hand at once to shoot a "Bang!". (4 life points)
 Elena Fuente: She can use any card in her hand as a "Missed!". (3 life points)
 Greg Digger: Each time another player is eliminated, Greg regains 2 life points. (4 life points)
 Herb Hunter: Each time another player is eliminated, Herb draws 2 cards. (4 life points)
 Jose Delgado: Up to twice in his turn, he may discard a blue card from his hand to draw 2 cards. (4 life points)
 Molly Stark: Each time she uses a card from her hand out of turn, she draws a card. (4 life points)
 Pat Brennan: During phase 1 of his turn, he may instead draw only one card in play in front of any player. (4 life points)
 Pixie Pete: During phase 1 of his turn, he draws 3 cards instead of 2. (3 life points)
 Sean Mallory: He may hold in his hand up to 10 cards. (3 life points)
 Tequila Joe: Each time he plays a "Beer", he regains 2 life points instead of 1. (4 life points)
 Vera Custer: At the beginning of her turn, she chooses another player still in play. Until her next turn, she has the same ability as that player's character. (3 life points)

 7 new brown border cards
 Brawl: Play this card and discard another card to "Cat Balou" all other players.
 Dodge: Play to avoid a "Bang!" and draw a card from the deck.
 Punch: "Bang!" a player with distance 1.
 Rag Time: Play this card and discard another card to "Panic" a player regardless of distance.
 Springfield: Play this card and discard another card to "Bang!" a player regardless of distance.
 Tequila: Play this card and discard another card to select a player to gain 1 life point.
 Whiskey: Play this card and discard another card to gain 2 life points.

 2 new blue border cards
 Binoculars: You see players at a distance -1.
 Hideout: Others see you at a distance +1.

 14 green border cards
 Bible: Avoid a "Bang!" and draw a card from the deck.
 Buffalo Rifle: "Bang!" a player regardless of distance.
 Can Can: "Cat Balou" a player regardless of distance.
 Canteen: Gain 1 life point.
 Conestoga: "Panic" a player regardless of distance.
 Derringer: "Bang!" a player and draw a card from the deck.
 Howitzer: "Bang!" to all other players.
 Iron Plate/Sombrero/Ten Gallon Hat: Avoid a "Bang!"
 Knife: "Bang!" a player with distance 1.
 Pepperbox: "Bang!" a player.
 Pony Express: Draw 3 cards from the deck.

A Fistful Of Cards (2005)
A set of fifteen new scenario cards, designed by players around the world selected by the original author, which can be mixed with the High Noon expansion. The name is inspired by the Western, A Fistful of Dollars.

The cards include:
 Abandoned Mine: Players draw from the discard pile and discard on the top of the deck.
 Ambush: The distance between players is 1. This is only modified by cards in play.
 Blood Brothers: Each player may choose to lose one of his life points to give to another player at the beginning of his turn.
 Dead Man: The first eliminated player returns in play with 2 life points and 2 cards.
 Hard Liquor: Each player may forfeit his drawing phase to regain 1 life point.
 Lasso: Cards in play in front of all players have no effect. "Draw!" is still required for "Jail", but this "Jail" has no effect regardless the result of draw.
 Law of the West: Players must show and play (if possible) the second card they draw in their turn.
 Ranch: Once at the end of his turn, each player may discard any number of cards from his hand to draw an equal number of cards from the deck.
 Ricochet: Players may play "Bang!" against cards in play; those cards are discarded unless the player controlling them plays a "Missed!".
 Russian Roulette: When this card enters in play, starting from the Sheriff, each player discards a "Missed!" or loses 2 life points (thus ending the effect).
 Sniper: Players may discard 2 "Bang!" cards to target an opponent; this counts as a "Bang!", but 2 "Missed!" cards are required to cancel this effect.
 Peyote: Players try to guess the suit of the card they draw and keep drawing until they are wrong.
 The Judge: Players cannot play cards in front of themselves (i.e. Green or Blue cards). Cards that are already placed in front of players will not be affected.
 Vendetta: Players "Draw!" at the end of their turn; on a Heart, they play an additional turn (but does not "Draw!" again).
 A Fistful of Cards: At the beginning of his turn, each player is the target of as many "Bang!" as the number of cards in his hand. This must be always the last card, and stays in play until the game ends.

Player must choose either High Noon or A Fistful of Cards as the last scenario card when the two expansions are mixed together.

Wild West Show (2010)
Bang! Wild West Show! is an expansion released in August 2010 with characters that revolve not around historical figures but rather around actors iconic to the western movie genre. The expansion also includes cards and rules not seen in previous expansions.

The 8 new characters are:
 Flint Westwood (Clint Eastwood) = During his turn, he may trade one card from his hand with 2 cards at random from the hand of another player. (4 life points)
 Big Spencer (Bud Spencer) = He starts with 5 cards. He cannot play any "Missed!" cards. (9 life points)
 Lee Van Kliff (Lee Van Cleef) = During his turn, he may discard one "Bang!" card to repeat the effect of a brown-bordered card he just played. (4 life points)
 Youl Grinner (Yul Brynner) = Before drawing, any player with more hand cards than Youl must give him one card. (4 life points)
 John Pain (John Wayne) = If he has less than 6 cards in hand, each time any player must "Draw!", John adds the card just drawn to his hand. (4 life points)
 Greygory Deck (Gregory Peck) = At the start of his turn, he may draw 2 characters at random. He has all the abilities of the drawn characters. The characters must be from the base game set. (4 life points)
 Gary Looter (Gary Cooper) = He draws all excess cards discarded by other players at the end of their turn (phase 3). (5 life points)
 Teren Kill (Terence Hill) = Each time he would be eliminated, he must "Draw!"; unless on Spades, he stays at 1 life point and draws 1 card. (3 life points)

The 10 special cards that come with Wild West Show! play similarly as the scenario cards in High Noon and A Fistful of Cards. A special card is revealed every time a "Stagecoach" or "Wells Fargo" is played.

The 10 new special cards are:
 Bone Orchard = At the beginnings of their turns, all eliminated players return permanently to game with 1 life point. Shuffle role cards and the returning player takes one random role card.
 Darling Valentine = Players discard all hand cards and then draw as many they had before their phase 1 (followed by their draw).
 Dorothy Rage = During each player's turn, he may force any player to play one hand card. The player calls out the name of a card. If the target player does not have the card named, he must show his hand cards. If he has the card, he has to play that card like it was his turn, but the caller chooses the target (if necessary).
 Gag = All players play without talking. Only gestures and sounds are allowed. Whoever breaks this rule loses 1 life point.
 Helena Zontoro = When Helena comes into play, all players must "Draw!"; on Hearts or Diamonds, shuffle all roles except the Sheriff and deal them out at random.
 Lady Rose of Texas = Each player may swap place with player on his right. If he does, player on right move to place and skip his next turn.
 Miss Susanna = All players have to play at least 3 cards on their turn. If they do not, they lose 1 life point.
 Sacagaway = During their turn, all players play with their hands revealed.
 Showdown = All cards in hand may be played as if they were "Bang!" cards, and all "Bang!" cards may be played as if they were "Missed!" cards.
 Wild West Show = The goal of each player becomes "Be the last one in play". Roles still apply as normal (Sheriff may not go to jail, killing an Outlaw brings the usual 3-card reward, etc.), but killing the Sheriff does not end the game.

Gold Rush (2011)
Bang! Gold Rush was released in 2011. It introduced some innovative gameplay mechanics: thanks to the shadow-gunslinger game variant, players are never really out of the game. During his turn, the shadow-gunslinger temporarily re-enters the game and he can play as if he was still alive. With Bang! Gold Rush, the outcome of the match can even be determined by an eliminated player.

Players can collect gold nuggets to buy equipment. The purchase of an "equipment" card allows players to selectively enhance their characters and develop new strategies.

The box contains:
 8 new characters
 Don Bell – At the end of his turn, he must "Draw!"; on Diamonds or Hearts, he plays one extra turn. At the end of the extra turn, he doesn't "Draw!" for another turn. (4 life points)
 Dutch Will – During phase 1 of his turn, he discards one of the cards he draws and gets 1 golden nugget from the bank. (4 life points)
 Jacky Murieta – He may discard 2 golden nuggets to play a "Bang!" (4 life points)
 Josh McCloud – Once per turn, he may discard 2 golden nuggets to buy 1 random equipment. (4 life points)
 Madam Yto – Each time a "Beer" card is played, she immediately draws a card. (4 life points)
 Pretty Luzena – Once per turn, she may buy 1 equipment for 1 less nugget than its cost (i.e. the first 1-cost equipment she buys is free, unless she bought another equipment beforehand during her turn). (4 life points)
 Raddie Snake – Up to twice per turn, he may discard 1 golden nugget to draw a card. (4 life points)
 Simeon Picos – Each time he loses a life point due to a card played by another player, Simeon gets 1 golden nugget from bank. (4 life points)
 24 equipment cards
 Shot (3 stock, 1 cost, brown border) A player of your choice, including yourself, will regain 1 life point.
 Bottle (3 stock, 2 cost, brown border) You can play this as "Bang!", "Panic!" or "Beer".
 Pardner (3 stock, 2 cost, brown border) You can play this as "Cat Balou", "Duel" or "General Store".
 Union Pacific (1 stock, 4 cost, brown border) Draw 4 cards.
 Gold Rush (1 stock, 5 cost, brown border) You end your turn and play another turn. Your life will restored to maximum.
 Horseshoe (1 stock, 2 cost, black border) Whenever you "Draw!", reveal 1 additional card and choose the result. Lucky Duke draws 3 cards with "Horseshoe".
 Wanted! (3 stock, 2 cost, black border) Play in front of any player. Anyone who eliminates the player with "Wanted!" draws 2 extra cards and takes 1 extra nugget.
 Gun Belt (1 stock, 2 cost, black border) Your limit for hand cards is 8 in your phase 3 (Sean Mallory has still 10 hand cards limit with or without Gun Belt and Big Spencer's limit equals MAX [8, actual life points number]).
 Gold Pan (1 stock, 3 cost, black border) During your turn, you may discard 1 nugget to draw one card. This can be used up to 2 times per turn.
 Lucky Charm (1 stock, 3 cost, black border) For each lost life point, you take 1 golden nugget from the bank (Simeon Picos takes 2 golden nuggets with "Lucky Charm").
 Boots (1 stock, 3 cost, black border) For each lost life point, you draw 1 card from the deck (Bart Cassidy draws 2 cards with Boots).
 Calumet (1 stock, 3 cost, black border) You are not affected by Diamonds cards.
 Pickaxe (1 stock, 4 cost) During your phase 1, you draw one additional card.
 Rhum (2 stock, 3 cost, brown border) "Draw!" 4 cards and regain 1 life point for each different suit.
 Rucksack (1 stock, 3 cost, black border) Pay 2 gold nuggets to regain 1 life point.
 30 golden nugget tokens
 1 "Shadow-Renegade" card

The Valley of Shadows (2014)
This expansion consists of 20 cards, mostly playing cards and several new character cards. First unofficial version was released in September 2011 in Czechia and Slovakia. It was officially released on October 16, 2014 by the Czech editor ALBI check ALBI webpage.

5 new characters:
 Lemonade Jim – Lemonade Joe (fictional character) – Each time another player plays a "Beer" card, Jim may discard a card to regain 1 life point. (4 life points)
 Henry Block – Each time another player discards or draws a card from Henry's hand or in front him, that player is the target of a "Bang!" (4 life points)
 Evelyn Shebang – She may decide not to draw some number of cards in her draw phase. For each card skipped, she shoots a "Bang!" at a different target in reachable distance. (4 life points)
 Colorado Bill – Each time he plays a "Bang!" card, he does a "Draw!"; on Spades, the shot cannot be "Missed!". (4 life points)
 Mick Defender – Each time he is the solo target of a brown card other than "Bang!", he may discard a "Missed!" card to avoid it. (4 life points)

3 bonus characters:
 Tuco Franziskaner – During his draw phase, he draws 2 extra cards if he has no blue cards in play. (5 life points)
 Black Flower – Once per turn, she can shoot an extra "Bang!" by discarding a Clubs card. (4 life points)
 Der Spot-Burst Ringer – Once per turn, he can play a "Bang!" card as "Gatling". (4 life points)

5 new blue border cards:
 Shotgun – range 1, weapon – Each time a player is hit by a "Bang!" card from the player with a "Shotgun", that player discards 1 card of his choice from hand.
 Lemat – range 1, weapon – Any card (except Missed! cards) can be played as a Bang! card on the player's turn.
 Rattlesnake – Play in front any player. At the beginning that player's turn, he must "Draw!"; on Spades, he loses 1 life point.
 Bounty – Play in front any player. Players that hit that player with Bang! cards draw 1 card from the deck.
 Ghost – Play in front any eliminated player. That player returns to the game without his ability and cannot gain or lose life points. He plays as a normal player as long he has the Ghost card in front him.

10 new brown border cards:
 Escape – If you are the solo target of card, you may discard this card to avoid that card or its effect.
 Last Call – Regain one life point. (Different from "Beer" in that it can still be used when only 2 players are left, and it cannot be used out of turn to revive.)
 Poker – All others players discard a card. If no one discards an Ace card, you can draw 2 cards from the discarded cards.
 Wild Band – Others players may discard "Bang!" card or 2 cards from hand.
 Saved! – Play only out of your turn. Prevent any player from losing 1 life point. If this saves him from elimination, you draw 2 card from the hand of that player.
 Backfire – Counts as "Missed!". Any player who targeted you with "Bang!" becomes a target of "Bang!".
 Tornado – Each player passes 2 cards of his choice to the left.
 Tomahawk – "Bang!" at distance 2.
 Fanning – Counts as "Bang!" at range. All players (except you) at distance 1 from primary target are also the target of "Bang!".
 Aim – Play together with a "Bang!" card. If the target player doesn't miss, he loses 2 life points instead 1. Only 1 "Missed!" is need to avoid this. (2 "Missed!" in the case of Slab The Killer).

Bang The Duel
This is a standalone game, without any need for prior possession of Bang! Expansions. It is for 2 players only. One player controls a team of law enforcers, while another player controls a team of bandits.

12 enforcer characters:
 Alan Pinkertoon: Each time he loses a life point, your opponent's AC is the target of a "Bang!".
 Annie Oakey: You may play hit as "Missed!" and "Missed!" as colt.
 Bart Masterson: When a player "reveals", draw 2 cards and choose 1 as the result.
 Bill Tightman: Draw 2 cards each time when another character is eliminated.
 Buffalo Bell: You may lose life points in place of your other character.
 Dalon Ranger: Each time your opponent makes you lose a life point, draw a card.
 Jango: Each time your opponent changes the AC, draw a card.
 Pat Garret: When drawing, show the second card you draw; if it is Horseshoe, draw an extra card from the opponent's deck.
 Tex Killer: Opponent must discard an extra card to avoid your "Bang!".
 The Stranger: You may play an additional "Bang!" during your turn.
 Wild Bill: Each time your opponent draws or discards a card from you, your opponent's AC is the target of a "Bang!".
 Wyatt Ear: Each time your opponent "Missed!" your "Bang!", draw a card.

12 bandit characters:
 Babe Leroy: Once during your turn, you may draw 2 cards if you have no cards in your hand.
 Bull Anderson: Each time another character is eliminated, steal 2 equipment or cards from them.
 Cattle Katie: Once during your turn, you may discard a beneficial equipment to draw 2 cards.
 Dalton Bros: Draw an extra card when drawing.
 Jack Ransome: You can play cards on any character in play.
 Pearl Hat: Once during your turn, you may discard a card to repeat the effect of a brown-bordered card on top of the discard pile.
 Sid Curry: Each time he is the target of a "Bang!", "reveal"; if it is Barrel, the "Bang!" is "Missed!" and the character who played the "Bang!" is the target of a "Bang!". (4 life points)
 Slim Poet: Each time your opponent makes you lose a life point, you may discard a random card from your opponent's hand. (4 life points)
 Soundance Kid: Once per turn, you may discard a card of your choice from hand to draw 1 card from each deck and discard one.
 Toco Ramirez: You may use any card in hand as a colt.
 Tom Thron: Each time he becomes AC, your opponent's RC is the target of a "Bang!".
 West Harding: You may play any number of "Bang!" on your turn.

Armed & Dangerous (2017)
New game mechanic with a new type of resource called Load.

 8 characters
 Al Preacher – When another player plays a blue or orange-bordered card, Al may pay 2 Loads to draw 1 card from deck. (4 life points)
 Bass Grevees – Once during his turn, he may discard 1 card from his hand to add 2 Loads to one of his cards. (4 life points)
 Bloody Mary – Each time her "Bang!" is "Missed!", she draws 1 card from the deck. (4 life points)
 Frankie Canton – Once during his turn, he may take 1 Load from any card and move it to his Load stock. (4 life points)
 Julie Cutter – Each time she loses a life point due to a card played by another player, she must "Draw!"; on Hearts or Diamonds, that player is the target of a "Bang!" (4 life points)
 Ms. Abigail – She may ignore the effects of brown-border cards with values J, Q, K and A if she is the only target. (4 life points)
 Mexicali Kid – Once during his turn, he may pay 2 Loads to shoot an extra "Bang!". (4 life points)
 Red Ringo – He starts with 4 Loads. During his turn, he may move up to 2 Loads from his Load stock to his cards. (5 life points)

 13 orange-border card
 Ace up the Sleeve – 2 Loads: Draw 1 card from the deck.
 Bandolier – 1 Load: Once during your turn, you may play one extra "Bang!" card.
 Big Fifty – 1 Load: Cancel the target player's ability and cards in play. (weapon, 6 range)
 Bell Tower – 1 Load: You can use your next card with distance 1 to all other players.
 Thunderer  – (weapon, 3 range)- 1 Load: Get your used Bang! back.
 Tumbleweed – 1 Load: Force a player to "Draw!" one more time.
 Crate - 2 Loads: Counts as "Missed!".
 Bomb - The player must "Draw!"; on Hearts or Diamonds, give it to another player. Otherwise, remove 2 loads. If the player has no more loads, lose 2 life points.
 Buntline Special – (weapon, 2 range) 1 Load: If the "Bang!" is missed, the target must discard one card.
 Whip - 3 Loads: Discard any card.
 Beer Keg - 3 Loads: Gain 1 life point.
 Lock Pick - 3 Loads: Draw 1 card from any player.
 Double Barrel – (weapon, 1 range) - 1 Load: If you use a Diamonds "Bang!" card, the target cannot use "Missed!".

Bang! The Bullet!
A deluxe version of Bang!, called Bang! The Bullet!, was released in 2007.

This set included three of the official expansions, High Noon (second edition), Dodge City, and A Fistful of Cards (second edition), along with several extras:
 A Sheriff's Badge
 Three special character cards:
Uncle Will – Once during his turn, he may play any card from hand as a "General Store". This card is a reference to Will Niebling, former CEO of Mayfair Games (which published the game in the USA until 2008).
Johnny Kisch – Each time he puts a card into play, all other cards in play with the same name are discarded. This card is a reference to Jo Nikisch, CEO of Abacus Spiele, the German publisher of the game.
Claus "The Saint" – He draws one more card than the number of players, keeps 2 for himself, then gives 1 to each player. This card was a bonus, "unglued" card originally included in the online daVinci newsletter. The author considers this card to be quite unbalanced and not suited for serious play.
 Two additional High Noon cards:
New Identity – At the beginning of their turn, each player looks at the character he is using to keep track of his life points. He may switch to the new identity for the rest of the game, starting with 2 life points.
Handcuffs – After drawing his cards in phase 1, the player whose turn it is names a suit; he can only play cards of that suit during his turn.
 Two blank cards – one for a character and one for a normal card.

The 2007 release of Bang! the Bullet! game follows the 3rd edition rules of the basic game and the 2nd edition rules of Dodge City.

The 2009 reprint of Bang! the Bullet! game follows the 4th edition rules of the basic game and the 3rd edition rules of Dodge City.  It does not include the player mats nor bullet tokens as found in the boxed version of Bang! 4th edition.

10th Anniversary edition
This edition was released in 2012. It comes in a metal tin, and contains the complete most recent version of the base game with the original 16 characters. It also contains 30 wooden bullet markers for keeping track of health, 7 player boards each with different artwork, and 10 extra characters.

The 10 extra characters are as follows:
Apache Kid, Chuck Wengam, Jose' Delgado, and Pixie Pete (all from the Dodge City expansion)
Big Spencer and Youl Grinner (from the Wild West Show expansion)
Madam Yto (from the Gold Rush expansion)
Colorado Bill and Henry Block (from the Valley of Shadows expansion)
Annie Versary (this is a new character available only with the 10th anniversary version): She may use any card as a "Bang!" card. (4 life points)

Video game
On October 29, 2009, Palzoun Entertainment (which acquired the official license from DaVinci Games) announced the development of a Bang! video game. The game was developed in partnership with SpinVector. It was published on the iTunes App Store on December 18, 2010. A console version was also expected to arrive in March 2011 but has been delayed.

A live action trailer of the game was released on November 2, 2010.

Online version
On May 14, 2012, Christopher Gordon Carr's Software Developer Portfolio released Kraplow!, an open source online Bang! clone, which can be played in-browser with AI or with other players. Kraplow! features all the rules from version 4.0 of Bang! and is open source.

The Starcraft II mod Barcraft is a copy of Bang! which replaces the wild west theme with themes and characters from the Warcraft, Starcraft and Diablo franchises.

BoardGameArena (BGA) is a real time board game online game system that allows to play Bang!.

Lawsuit
In 2014, DaVinci Editrice initiated a lawsuit against Ziko Games, the Chinese manufacturer that had published Legends of the Three Kingdoms, a game that DaVinci claimed was a clone of Bang!, simply changing the Wild West theme and art to that of ancient China.
While the court found there was potential for copyright infringement on its initial hearing,
it ultimately ruled in favor of Ziko Games and dismissed the case in 2016.

Reviews
Pyramid

See also
Mafia (party game)

References

External links
Bang! the Official Video Game
dV Games (formerly daVinci Editrice) official website
FAQ, editions, designer's notes and other info at the author's personal website

BANG!cz {en, cz}: Eldorado, MartinCity, Bang! Card Generator, Forum, Downloads and more
The Bang! Blog: Death Mesa, Robbers' Roost, character strategy guides, card explanations, variants, modding, and more
 Bang! at Boardgaming.com
 Kraplow! Online Bang! clone/Web/Browser/Free at Christopher Gordon Carr's Software Developer Portfolio
 Barcraft Arcade Highlight A mod for Starcraft II

Card games introduced in 2002
Dedicated deck card games
Multiplayer games
Origins Award winners
Mayfair Games games
Western (genre) games